Catoptria margaritella, the pearl-band grass veneer, is a species of moth of the family Crambidae. It was described by Michael Denis and Ignaz Schiffermüller in 1775 and is found in Europe.

The wingspan is 20–24 mm. The forewings are  ferruginous brown, becoming ferruginous-yellow dorsally ; a shining white gradually dilating median streak from base to near termen, broadest at 4, thence pointed, upper edge straight ; cilia shining pale fuscous. Hindwings are light grey.brown.

The moth flies from June to September depending on the location.

The larvae feed on various grasses and mosses.

References

External links
 Waarneming.nl 
 Lepidoptera of Belgium
 Catoptria margaritella at UKMoths

Crambini
Moths of Europe